Cristofer Augusto Jesús Soto Gonzáles (born 6 January 1990) is a Peruvian footballer who plays as a forward.

Club career
He came through youth ranks of Alianza Lima. Soto made his professional debut in the Torneo Descentralizado on 17 February 2008 in the first round of the 2008 season. The match was away to Huaraz against Sport Ancash and finished in a 1-0 loss for Alianza. He entered the match in the 70th minute replacing Reimond Manco.

In 2009, having no chances on the first team, he was loaned out to CNI.
He returned to Alianza in the 2010 season. In 2011 Soto played the in 2011 U-20 Copa Libertadores, where he finished as the top goalscorer.

References

External links 

1990 births
Living people
Footballers from Lima
Association football forwards
Peruvian footballers
Peruvian Primera División players
Club Alianza Lima footballers
Colegio Nacional Iquitos footballers
Club Deportivo Universidad de San Martín de Porres players
Universidad Técnica de Cajamarca footballers
Unión Huaral footballers
León de Huánuco footballers
Comerciantes Unidos footballers
Cienciano footballers